Stafford (formerly, Brown's Mill and Brown's Camp) is an unincorporated community in Humboldt County, California.

The town was founded in 1895 or 1896; the name honors Judge Cyrus G. Stafford. The name "Brown" honors Percy Brown, lumber mill owner. An attraction in the area was the Stafford Inn, a converted bunk house from Brown's mill. The inn was destroyed in a flood in 1964.

References

Unincorporated communities in Humboldt County, California
Unincorporated communities in California